Nurse TV may refer to:

Nurse TV (Australia), an Australian community television project
NurseTV (TV network), an American internet TV network